Irving High School is a public high school in Irving, Texas. It was the first high school established in the Irving Independent School District.

Irving High School includes, like all the other Irving ISD high schools, wireless internet in the classrooms, Chromebooks in every classroom, and a Distance Learning Lab.

In 2009, the school was rated "academically acceptable" by the Texas Education Agency.

Notable alumni

Frank Beard, drummer for ZZ Top
Blake Beavan, professional baseball player
Jim Beaver, actor
Demarcus Faggins, former professional football player
Marquez Haynes, former professional basketball player
Kelvin Korver, American football player
David Lowery, film director
John Moore, Pulitzer Prize-winning photojournalist
Trevor Story, Major League Baseball player
Tyson Thompson, former professional football player
Daryl Washington, former professional football player

References

External links
 
 Irving High School Homepage
 Irving High School (Archive)

High schools in Irving, Texas
Educational institutions established in 1935
Irving Independent School District high schools
1935 establishments in Texas